Lucie Valová (born 10 December 1981 in Ostrava) is a Czech sport shooter. She competed at the 2000 Summer Olympics in the women's 50 metre rifle three positions event, in which she tied for 14th place, and the women's 10 metre air rifle event, in which she tied for 36th place.

References

1981 births
Living people
ISSF rifle shooters
Sportspeople from Ostrava
Czech female sport shooters
Olympic shooters of the Czech Republic
Shooters at the 2000 Summer Olympics
21st-century Czech women